Ghaniabad (also Romanized as Ghanīābād) is a village in Mazinan Rural District, Central District, Davarzan County, Razavi Khorasan Province, Iran. At the 2006 census, its population was 309, in 97 families.

References 

Populated places in Davarzan County